Caren Pistorius (born 30 September 1990) is a South African-New Zealand actress. She is best known for her role as Rose in the 2015 film Slow West.

Early life
Pistorius was born in Rustenburg, South Africa. Her family moved to Auckland, New Zealand when she was 12. She took drama classes at school. She studied at the Auckland University of Technology.

Filmography

Film

Television

References

External links
 
 

Living people
21st-century New Zealand actresses
21st-century South African actresses
New Zealand film actresses
New Zealand television actresses
People from Rustenburg
South African emigrants to New Zealand
South African film actresses
South African television actresses
Auckland University of Technology alumni
1990 births